Bading may refer to:

 Gerhard Adolph Bading (1870–1946), American politician and diplomat
Hilmar Bading (*1958), German physician and neuroscientist 
 Bading Pob. (Bgy. 22), a place in Butuan, Philippines